Minglun is a town in Huanjiang Maonan Autonomous County, Guangxi, China.

Administrative division
As of 2021, the town is divided into one community and fifteen villages: 
Minglun Community
Yajing
Longshui
Xiangyao
Baoshan
Caibo
Cuishan
Baixiang
Jixiang
Gancheng
Beisong
Yinghao
Bamian
Hekuang
Haodong
Liuping

History
The area belonged to Anhua Department in 1905, during the late Qing dynasty (1644–1911).

In 1912, it was renamed "Anhua County" and soon renamed "Yibei County" in January 1914, and came under the jurisdiction of Liujiang Municipality.

On 20 November 1949, the People's Liberation Army (PLA) took control of Yibei County and it came under the jurisdiction of Qingyuan Special District. One year later, it was under the jurisdiction of Yishan Special District. On 11 August 1952, Yibei County and Si'en County merged to form Huanjiang County, and the area belonged to Minglun District. In 1958, Xianfeng People's Commune was set up and one year later reverted to its former name of Minglun District. It was incorporated as a township in 1984. In 1995, it was upgraded to a town.

Geography
The town is situated at the north of Huanjiang Maonan Autonomous County. It borders Xunle Miao Ethnic Township in the north, Dongxing Town and Longyan Township in the east, Da'an Township and Changmei Township in the south, and Luoyang Town in the west.

There are two streams in the town: Shangbang Stream and Minglun Stream.

Climate

Economy
The economy is supported primarily by agriculture and mineral resources. Significant crops include rice and corn. Sugarcane is one of the important economic crops in the region. The region abounds with anthracite, lead, zinc, and pyrrhotite.

Demographics

The 2019 census reported the town had a population of 41,149.

Tourist attractions
The Former Residence of Lu Tao is a popular attraction.

Transportation
The town  is crossed by the Provincial Highway S209.

Notable people
  (1882–1949), general of the Republic of China and governor of Guizhou. 

 (born 1962), Chinese Communist politician, vice chairperson of the Guangxi People's Congress.

 Qin Zhan, Chinese Communist politician.

References

Bibliography

 

Divisions of Huanjiang Maonan Autonomous County